James MacAdam (1801, Belfast – 1861) was an Irish naturalist and geologist.

Mcadam was educated at the Royal Belfast Academical Institution, and then at Trinity College Dublin. He had a private geological museum, which included specimens collected during excavations made during the construction of the Irish railways. In 1849 he was appointed the first librarian of Queen's College, Belfast. 
He was a Fellow of the Geological Society, founder member and President of the Belfast Natural History Society and one of the founders of Belfast Botanic Gardens.

His younger brother was his business partner in the Soho Foundry in Townsend Street which they had established in 1846. At its height in the 1850s, the firm had a workforce of 250 and an international reputation for the production of turbine engines (horizontal water wheels developed in France by Benoît Fourneyron). Robert Shipboy MacAdam was an antiquary and leading Irish-language revivalist.

References

Nash, R. and Ross, H.C.G. The development of natural history in early 19th century Ireland in From Linnaeus to Darwin: commentaries on the history of biology and geology Society for the bibliography of Natural History 13:27-

1801 births
1861 deaths
Scientists from Belfast
Irish naturalists
People educated at the Royal Belfast Academical Institution
Fellows of the Geological Society of London
Alumni of Trinity College Dublin
Irish geologists